In the First Degree is a 1927 American silent melodrama film, directed by Phil Rosen. It stars Alice Calhoun, Bryant Washburn, and Gayne Whitman, and was released on April 15, 1927.

Cast
Alice Calhoun as Barbara Hurd
Bryant Washburn as Philip Stanwood
Gayne Whitman as John Pendleton
Trilby Clark as Gladys Hutton
Gareth Hughes as Jerry Pendleton
Joseph Girard as James Hurd
Milton Fahrney as Warden
William De Vaull as Butler

References

External links 
 
 
 

Films directed by Phil Rosen
Melodrama films
American silent feature films
American black-and-white films
1927 drama films
1927 films
1920s American films
Silent American drama films